Lithic sandstones, or lithic arenites, or litharenites, are sandstones with a significant (>5%) component of lithic fragments, though quartz and feldspar are usually present as well, along with some clayey matrix.  Lithic sandstones can have a speckled (salt and pepper) or gray color, and are usually associated with one specific type of lithic fragment (i.e., igneous, sedimentary, or metamorphic).

Tectonically, lithic sandstones often form in a wide variety sedimentary depositional environments (including fluvial, deltaic, and alluvial sediments) associated with active margins.  This tectonic setting provides the source of the lithic fragments, either through arc volcanism, thin-skinned faulting, continental collisions, unroofing, and subduction roll-back.

See also
Arkose
Quartz arenite

References

Sedimentary rocks
Sandstone